Michalis Ioannou (Greek: Μιχάλης Ιωάννου; born 30 June 2000) is a Cypriot professional footballer who plays as a central midfielder for Cypriot First Division club Anorthosis. A product of Anorthosis Famagusta's football academy, Ioannou represented his country at various age groups before making his international debut for the Cyprus national team in 2019.

Club career

Anorthosis 
Ioannou made his debut for Anorthosis in a match against AEK Larnaca.

On 6 April 2019, he signed his first professional contract with Anorthosis until 2023.

On 11 December 2019, Anorthosis increased its purchase clause from 200 to 610 thousand euros.

Loan to Roda JC 
On 11 August 2020, Ioannou joined Roda on loan until the end of the season.

International career 

Ioannou made his Cyprus national team debut on 8 June 2019 in a Euro 2020 qualifier match against Scotland, at Hampden Park Stadium as a starter.

International goals

Career statistics

References

External links 
 
 

2000 births
Living people
Cypriot footballers
Cyprus youth international footballers
Cyprus international footballers
Anorthosis Famagusta F.C. players
Cypriot First Division players
Association football midfielders